Eros House is a Brutalist building in Catford, Lewisham, south London. It was designed by Rodney Gordon and Owen Luder and built 1960-63. The building replaced the old Eros Theater in Catford, and was part of a larger urban renewal project that also included a shopping center designed by Gordon and Luder. The building has characteristics that are typical of Luders and Gordon's brutalist architecture, including the freestanding stair tower.

References

External links
 Eros House at RIBApix
 Eros House at Catford Tales

Catford
Brutalist architecture in London
Grade II listed buildings in the London Borough of Lewisham